Details was an American monthly men's magazine that was published by Condé Nast, founded in 1982 by Annie Flanders. Though primarily a magazine devoted to fashion and lifestyle, Details also featured reports on relevant social and political issues. In November 2015 Condé Nast announced that the magazine would cease publication with the issue of December 2015/January 2016.

History
In 1982, Details was launched, as a downtown culture magazine, by Annie Flanders, a former fashion editor, at a meeting of former employees of the newly defunct SoHo Weekly News, including Ronnie Cooke, Stephen Saban, Lesley Vinson, Megan Haungs and Bill Cunningham.

The Los Angeles Times detailed how the magazine changed hands a number of times in the years thereafter:

Alan Patricof bought the magazine in 1988. Condé Nast bought the magazine a year later for $2 million. Its later format stemmed from a relaunch in October 2000 following the transfer of the magazine from Condé Nast to sibling division Fairchild Publications. Between its last issue at Condé Nast and first at Fairchild, publication of Details was temporarily suspended. This allowed for extensive redesign and strategic repositioning of the magazine.

Music Matters CDs
From 1991 to 1999 the magazine produced sampler CDs that were sent out to current subscribers free of charge. While the CDs concentrated on then-current music, older songs were included as well. The initial CD was produced by Andrea Norlander of MTV, who oversaw concept, musical content, design, and marketing of the project.

Comics journalism 
Cartoonist Art Spiegelman was comics editor of Details in the mid-1990s; in 1997, he began assigning comics journalism pieces to a number of his cartoonist associates. The magazine published these works of journalism in comics form throughout 1998 and 1999, helping to legitimize the form in popular perception.
 "Burning Man" (Nov. 1997), pp. 172-175 — Peter Kuper 
 "Pray for Surf" (May 1998), pp. 150-153 — Ben Katchor on sports
 "So Much Comedy, So Little Time," (July 1998), pp. 148-151 — Peter Bagge
 "Clothes Encounters" (August 1998), pp. 128-133 — Charles Burns illustrating a fashion show
 "The War Crimes Trials (September 1998), pp. 260-265 — Joe Sacco on the aftermath of the Bosnian War
 "Ozziefest '98" (October 1998), pp. 184-187 — Kaz on Ozzy Osbourne
 "Ready to Die" (May 1999), pp. 146-151 — Kim Deitch 
 "Smash Violence!" (September 1999), pp. 202-203 — Jay Lynch parodying censorship of the media
 "Chasing Melissas!" (October 1999), pp. 192-197 — Kim Deitch on the link between computer viruses and pornography
 "The Rude Blues" (April 2000), pp. 140-145 — Joe Sacco

Controversy
In December 2002, Details featured American pop star Justin Timberlake on its cover, accompanied by the text: “Can we ever forgive Justin Timberlake for all that sissy music? Hey... at least he got into Britney's pants”. This cover and headline were featured retrospectively in the 2021 documentary Framing Britney Spears, which highlighted how Timberlake benefited from the media narrative surrounding his breakup with Britney Spears, while Spears herself saw her image suffer. This same cover features another story, "Forget feminism: why your wife should take your name."

In 2004, Details published a piece titled "Gay or Asian?" that featured a photo of an East Asian man, and "tips" on how to tell the difference. Some of the text that accompanied the photo: "One cruises for chicken; the other takes it General Tso-style. Whether you're into shrimp balls or shaved balls, entering the dragon requires imperial tastes." The article generated protests over its racism and homophobia — and over how it erased the existence of gay Asian men. To protest, LGBT Asian American individuals and groups came together and held demonstrations.

Staff contributors
Frequent contributors included Augusten Burroughs, Blake Nelson, Michael Chabon, and Bill Cunningham. Contributors included Beauregard Houston-Montgomery. Former staffers included Pete Wells, Ian Daly, Kayleen Schaefer, Erica Cerulo, Andrew Essex, Yaran Noti, Jeff Gordinier, Karl Taro Greenfeld, and Alex Bhattacharji.

Its Editor-in-chief, for 15 years, since 2000 was Dan Peres, the former husband of Australian actress Sarah Wynter.

References

External links
  
 </ref>

1982 establishments in the United States
2015 disestablishments in the United States
Cultural magazines published in the United States
Fashion magazines published in the United States
Men's magazines published in the United States
Monthly magazines published in the United States
Defunct Condé Nast magazines
Defunct magazines published in the United States
Magazines established in 1982
Magazines disestablished in 2015
Magazines published in New York City
Men's fashion magazines